Ben Beauchemin is a Canadian actor and stand-up comedian from Winnipeg, Manitoba. He is most noted for his recurring role as Gerald in Kim's Convenience, for which he was a Canadian Screen Award nominee for Best Guest Actor in a Comedy Series at the 10th Canadian Screen Awards in 2022.

He previously had a recurring role as Blair in five episodes of the comedy series Less Than Kind.

Filmography

Film

Television

References

External links

21st-century Canadian male actors
Canadian male television actors
Canadian male film actors
Male actors from Winnipeg
Franco-Manitoban people
Living people
Year of birth missing (living people)